Carex praegracilis is a species of North American sedge known as clustered field sedge, field sedge, and expressway sedge. Carex praegracilis is cultivated in the specialty horticulture trade as lawn substitute and meadow-like plantings.

Distribution
This sedge is native to much of North America, from Alaska across southern Canada and throughout the continental United States, from California to Maine, except for the southeastern region.

Description
Carex praegracilis grows in wet and seasonally wet environments in a number of habitats, including meadows and wetlands. It tolerates disturbed habitat such as roadsides and thrives in alkaline substrates.

The plant is often dioecious, with an individual bearing male or female flowers in its inflorescences, but not both. The range of this sedge is spreading, especially along roadsides where the application of road salt has apparently encouraged its growth.

References

External links
Carex praegracilis - Photo gallery

praegracilis
Flora of Canada
Flora of the United States
Plants described in 1884